Petrolini is an Italian surname. Notable people with this surname include:

 Ettore Petrolini (1884–1936), Italian stage and film actor, playwright, screenwriter and novelist
 Vincenzo Petrolini (died 1606), Roman Catholic Bishop of Muro Lucano

See also 
 Petris (disambiguation)

Italian-language surnames